Saddar Town , lies in the central part of the city that formed much of the historic colonial core of Karachi. Saddar Town was formed in 2001 as part of The Local Government Ordinance 2001, and was subdivided into 11 union councils. The town system was disbanded in 2011, and Saddar Town was re-organized as part of Karachi South District in 2015.

Etymology
The word Saddar generally means the "center" (of a settlement) and also the "head" (of a group of people or an organisation). The word Saddar may loosely be translated into "Downtown" as it shares common characteristics with a Downtown of any particular city located in United States. This includes historic areas, attractions, being in the center etc.

Location
Saddar Town is located in the colonial heart of Karachi. It is bordered by Jamshed Town and Clifton Cantonment to the east, Kiamari Town and the Arabian Sea to the south and Lyari Town to the west. The majority of the population were Gujarati and Sindhi Muslims. Among the Gujarati-speaking people were trading communities such as Memons and Marwaris.

History 
Saddar Town contained much of the oldest parts of Karachi.  The federal government under Pervez Musharraf, introduced local government reforms in the year 2000, which eliminated the previous "third tier of government" (administrative divisions) and replaced it with the fourth tier (districts). The effect in Karachi was the dissolution of the former Karachi Division, and the merging of its five districts to form a new Karachi City-District with eighteen autonomous constituent towns including Saddar Town. In 2011, the system was disbanded but remained in place for bureaucratic administration until 2015, when the Karachi Metropolitan Corporation system was reintroduced. In 2015, Saddar Town was re-organized as part of Karachi South.

Neighbourhoods 

Saddar Town was made up of the following:

See also 
 Saddar
 Karachi
 Darya Lal Mandir

References

External links 
 Karachi Website
Saddar Town

 
Towns in Karachi
Clifton, Karachi
Karachi South District